The Lo Nuestro Award for Urban Song of the Year is an honor presented annually by American television network Univision at the Lo Nuestro Awards. The accolade was established to recognize the most talented performers of Latin music. The nominees and winners were originally selected by a voting poll conducted among program directors of Spanish-language radio stations in the United States and also based on chart performance on Billboard Latin music charts. However, since 2004, the winners are selected through an online survey. The trophy awarded is shaped in the form of a treble clef.

The award was first presented to "Lo Que Pasó, Pasó" by Puerto-Rican American performer Daddy Yankee. Yankee also has the record for most nominations for Urban Song of the Year with 14 nominations; Wisin & Yandel are the most awarded artists with three wins. Panamanian rapper Flex's "Te Quiero", won the Lo Nuestro and the Latin Grammy Award for Best Urban Song. "Lovumba" by Daddy Yankee, "Taboo" by Don Omar, "Te Quiero" by Flex, "El Amor" by Tito El Bambino, and "Llamé Pa' Verte" by Wisin & Yandel, won the Lo Nuestro and reached number-one in the Billboard Latin Songs chart. Puerto-Rican American reggaeton duo R.K.M & Ken-Y are the most nominated artists without a win, with three unsuccessful nominations. In 2017, "Hasta el Amanecer" by American singer and rapper Nicky Jam became the most recent award recipient of the award.

Winners and nominees
Listed below are the winners of the award for each year, as well as the other nominees.

Multiple wins and nominations

See also
 Billboard Latin Music Award for Latin Rhythm Airplay Song of the Year
 Latin Grammy Award for Best Urban Song
 Los Premios MTV Latinoamérica for Best Urban Artist

References

Urban Song
Latin hip hop
Song awards
Awards established in 2006